Bjørn Elmquist (born 13 November 1938 in Svendborg) is a Danish lawyer and journalist, who served as member of parliament for Denmark's Liberal Party from 1978 to 1990, and then the Danish Social Liberal Party from 1990 until 1998.

References

Living people
1938 births
21st-century Danish lawyers
20th-century Danish politicians
20th-century Danish journalists
Danish foreign correspondents